Povorino is a town and the administrative center of Povorinsky District in the east of Voronezh Oblast, Russia. Population:

History
It emerged as a settlement around the eponymous railway station in 1870 and was granted town status in 1954.

Administrative and municipal status
Within the framework of administrative divisions, Povorino serves as the administrative center of Povorinsky District. As an administrative division, it is incorporated within Povorinsky District as Povorino Urban Settlement. As a municipal division, this administrative unit also has urban settlement status and is a part of Povorinsky Municipal District.

Transportation
A junction of railroads and motorways, the town is situated between Tambov and Volgograd on European route E119 from Moscow to Astara, Azerbaijan.

Military
The town was home to Povorino air base during the Cold War.

References

Notes

Sources

Cities and towns in Voronezh Oblast
Populated places in Povorinsky District
Populated places established in 1870
1870 establishments in the Russian Empire